The women's ski slopestyle competition of the FIS Freestyle Ski and Snowboarding World Championships 2015 was held at Kreischberg, Austria on January 20 (qualifying)  and January 21 (finals). 
15 athletes from 10 countries competed.

Qualification
The following are the results of the qualification.

Final
The following are the results of the finals.

References

ski slopestyle, women's